Slimane Dazi (born 26 May 1960) is a French actor.

Filmography

References

External links 

French male film actors
Living people
1960 births
21st-century French male actors
French male television actors